The 1942 Oklahoma Sooners football team represented the University of Oklahoma in the 1942 college football season. In their second year under head coach Dewey Luster, the Sooners compiled a 3–5–2 record (3–1–1 against conference opponents), finished in second place in the Big Six Conference, and outscored their opponents by a combined total of 135 to 78.

No Sooners received All-America honors in 1942, but six Sooners received all-conference honors: William Campbell (back), Huel Hamm (back), Jack Marsee (center), Clare Morford (guard), W.G. Lamb (end), and Homer Simmons (tackle).

Schedule

NFL Draft
The following players were drafted into the National Football League following the season.

References

Oklahoma
Oklahoma Sooners football seasons
Oklahoma Sooners football